Fujiwara no Mitsuyoshi (藤原 光能, 1132 - March 23, 1183) was a court noble of the late Heian period. He was a personal attendant of Emperor Go-Shirakawa. He served as Associate Counselor, Commander of the Middle Palace Guards, Head Chamberlain, Governor of Shimotsuke Province, Lieutenant General of the Imperial Guard Division, and held the court rank of Senior Third Rank.

Life 
Mitsuyoshi was born in 1132, the son of Junior Assistant Minister of Popular Affairs Fujiwara no Tadanari. His mother was the daughter of Minamoto no Suetada.

In his early career, he served as Lieutenant General of the Imperial Guard Division and Governor of Shimotsuke Province.

In 1176, from his position as a personal attendant of Emperor Go-Shirakawa, he was promoted to Head Chamberlain (kurōdo no tō), surpassing the position of Taira no Kiyomori's favorite son Tomomori.

In 1179, he briefly served as Associate Counselor, but was removed from office following Kiyomori's coup d'état the same year. After the relocation of the capital to Fukuhara and the resumption of the imperial government the next year, Mitsuyoshi regained his position as Associate Counselor in 1181. He was then promoted to Commander of Middle Palace Guards and given the court rank of Senior Third Rank.

In 1183, Mitsuyoshi underwent pabbajjā. He died on March 23, 1183 at the age of 52.

According to The Tale of the Heike, Mitsuyoshi presented the court order for the punitive expedition of the Taira clan and brought it to Minamoto no Yoritomo. According to Gukanshō, however, this story is pointed out to not be factual. Nevertheless, there is no doubt that Mitsuyoshi was a close attendant of Emperor Go-Shirakawa, and a portrait of him and Go-Shirakawa survives at Jingō-ji.

Family 
 Father: Fujiwara no Tadanari
 Mother: Minamoto no Suetada's daughter
 Wife: Adachi Tōmoto's daughter
 Wife: Nakahara Hirosue's daughter
 Son: Nakahara no Chikayoshi (1143-1209)
 Wife: Monk Kyōson's daughter
 Fujiwara no Tadatsune
 Unknown mother:
 Son: Ōe no Hiromoto (1148-1225)
 Son: Fujiwara no Ieyoshi (adopted by Fujiwara no Kanemitsu)

References 

People of Heian-period Japan
1132 births
1181 deaths